The following is a list of awards and nominations received by American actor Eddie Murphy. He has received Golden Globe Award nominations for his performances in 48 Hrs., the Beverly Hills Cop series, Trading Places, The Nutty Professor, and Dolemite Is My Name. In 2007, he won the Golden Globe for Best Supporting Actor and received a nomination for the Academy Award for Best Supporting Actor for his portrayal of soul singer James "Thunder" Early in Dreamgirls.

Major associations

Academy Awards

BAFTA Awards

Golden Globe Awards

Grammy Awards

Emmy Award

Screen Actors Guild Award

Critics awards

Other associations

American Cinematheque Award

American Comedy Awards

Annie Awards

BET Awards

Black Reel Awards

Blockbuster Entertainment Awards

Bravo Otto Award

CinEuphoria Award

Gold Derby Awards

Golden Raspberry Awards

Golden Schmoes Award

Hollywood Film Festival Award

MTV Movie & TV Awards

NAACP Image Awards

Nickelodeon Kids' Choice Awards

Online Film & Television Association Award

People's Choice Awards

Satellite Awards

Saturn Awards

ShoWest Convention Award

Walk of Fame

Notes

References

External links
 

Murphy, Eddie
Accolades